The 2018 Wyoming Cowboys football team represented the University of Wyoming during the 2018 NCAA Division I FBS football season. The Cowboys are coached by fifth-year head coach Craig Bohl and play their home games at War Memorial Stadium as a member of the Mountain Division of the Mountain West Conference. They finished the regular season 6–6, 4–4 in Mountain West play to finish in third place in the Mountain division. Despite being bowl eligible, they were not invited to a bowl game.

Previous season
The Cowboys finished the 2017 season 8–5, 5–3 in Mountain West play to finish in a tie for second place in the Mountain Division. They were invited to the Famous Idaho Potato Bowl where they defeated Central Michigan.

2018 recruiting class
The Cowboys announced an early signing class of 20 high school student-athletes on December 20. On February 24, they announced the signing of two more student-athletes.

Preseason

Award watch lists
Listed in the order that they were released

Mountain West media days
During the Mountain West media days held July 24–25 at the Cosmopolitan on the Las Vegas Strip, the Cowboys were predicted to finish in second place in the Mountain Division.

Media poll

Preseason All-Mountain West Team
The Cowboys had three players selected to the preseason all-Mountain West team. Strong safety Andrew Wingard was selected as the preseason defensive player of the year.

Defense

Youhanna Ghaifan – DT

Carl Granderson – DE

Andrew Wingard – SS

Schedule

Source:

Personnel

Coaching staff

Roster

Statistics

Team

Offense

Defense

Key: SOLO: Solo Tackles, AST: Assisted Tackles, TOT: Total Tackles, TFL: Tackles-for-loss, SACK: Quarterback Sacks, INT: Interceptions, BU: Passes Broken Up, QBH: Quarterback Hits, FF: Forced Fumbles, FR: Fumbles Recovered, BLK: Kicks or Punts Blocked, SAF: Safeties

Special teams

Scores by quarter (all opponents)

Awards and honors

All-Conference Teams
First Team

Nico Evans, Sr., RB

Andrew Wingard, Sr., DB

Cooper Rothe, Jr., PK

Second Team

Carl Granderson, Sr., DL

Honorable Mention

Tyler Hall, Jr., CB

Logan Wilson, Jr., LB

Conference Awards

Cooper Rothe – Special Teams Player of the Year

All–America Teams

Keegan Cryder, Fr., C – Freshman All–American (FWAA)

Senior Bowls

Carl Granderson – Senior Bowl

Andrew Wingard – East–West Shrine Game

Nico Evans – NFLPA Collegiate Bowl

Game summaries

at New Mexico State

 Passing leaders: Tyler Vander Waal (WYO): 13–22, 137 YDS; Matt Romero (NMSU): 16–27, 140 YDS, 1 TD
 Rushing leaders: Nico Evans (WYO): 24 CAR, 190 YDS, 2 TD; Jason Huntley (NMSU): 9 CAR, 22 YDS
 Receiving leaders: Austin Fort (WYO): 2 REC, 51 YDS; Drew Dan (NMSU): 2 REC, 60 YDS, 1 TD

Washington State

 Passing leaders: Tyler Vander Waal (WYO): 8–20, 67 YDS, 1 INT; Gardner Minshew (WSU): 38–57, 319 YDS, 3 TD, 1 INT
 Rushing leaders: Nico Evans (WYO): 18 CAR, 89 YDS, 1 TD; James Williams (WSU): 16 CAR, 82 YDS, 1 TD
 Receiving leaders: James Price (WYO): 2 REC, 23 YDS; Jamire Calvin (WSU): 5 REC, 82 YDS

at Missouri

 Passing leaders: Tyler Vander Waal (WYO): 13–28, 160 YDS; Drew Lock (MIZ): 33–45, 398 YDS, 4 TD
 Rushing leaders: Jevon Bigelow (WYO): 18 CAR, 56 YDS, 1 TD; Damarea Crockett (MIZ): 19 CAR, 73 YDS
 Receiving leaders: James Price (WYO): 1 REC, 55 YDS; Emanuel Hall (MIZ): 10 REC, 171 YDS, 1 TD

Wofford

 Passing leaders: Tyler Vander Waal (WYO): 25–42, 224 YDS, 2 TD, 1 INT; Joe Newman (WOF): 9–15, 73 YDS, 2 INT
 Rushing leaders: Xazavian Valladay (WYO): 15 CAR, 57 YDS; Lennox McAfee (WOF): 13 CAR, 91 YDS
 Receiving leaders: Austin Conway (WYO): 11 REC, 89 YDS; Blake Morgan (WOF): 6 REC, 48 YDS

Boise State

 Passing leaders: Tyler Vander Waal (WYO): 15–25, 214 YDS, 1 TD; Brett Rypien (BSU): 28–42, 342 YDS, 2 TD
 Rushing leaders: Nico Evans (WYO): 12 CAR, 141 YDS, 1 TD; Alexander Mattison (BSU): 20 CAR, 57 YDS, 1 TD
 Receiving leaders: James Price (WYO): 2 REC, 77 YDS, 1 TD; A.J. Richardson (BSU): 6 REC, 113 YDS, 1 TD

at Hawaii

 Passing leaders: Tyler Vander Waal (WYO): 9–16, 87 YDS; Chevan Cordeiro (HAW): 19–29, 148 YDS, 2 TD, 1 INT
 Rushing leaders: Nico Evans (WYO): 24 CAR, 192 YDS; Dayton Furuta (HAW): 16 CAR, 101 YDS
 Receiving leaders: James Price (WYO): 3 REC, 28 YDS; Marcus Armstrong-Brown (HAW): 6 REC, 49 YDS

at Fresno State

 Passing leaders: Tyler Vander Waal (WYO): 12–32, 117 YDS, 1 INT; Marcus McMaryion (FRES): 22–32, 287 YDS, 2 TD
 Rushing leaders: Nico Evans (WYO): 18 CAR, 58 YDS; Marcus McMaryion (FRES): 7 CAR, 53 YDS, 1 TD
 Receiving leaders: Raghib Ismail Jr. (WYO): 2 REC, 46 YDS; Jared Rice (FRES): 7 REC, 94 YDS, 1 TD

Utah State

 Passing leaders: Sean Chambers (WYO): 3–5, 62 YDS; Jordan Love (USU): 12–28, 53 YDS, 1 INT
 Rushing leaders: Nico Evans (WYO): 25 CAR, 133 YDS, 1 TD; Darwin Thompson (USU): 17 CAR, 109 YDS, 2 TD
 Receiving leaders: Nico Evans (WYO): 2 REC, 40 YDS; Aaren Vaughns (USU): 2 REC, 14 YDS

at Colorado State

 Passing leaders: Sean Chambers (WYO): 7–10, 116 YDS, 2 TD; Collin Hill (CSU): 34–54, 333 YDS, 2 INT
 Rushing leaders: Nico Evans (WYO): 28 CAR, 176 YDS, 1 TD; Marvin Kinsey Jr. (CSU): 5 CAR, 24 YDS, 2 TD
 Receiving leaders: James Price (WYO): 3 REC, 50 YDS; Preston Williams (CSU): 10 REC, 126 YDS

San Jose State

Passing Leaders: Sean Chambers (WYO): 4–8, 51 YDS, 1 TD; Josh Love (SJSU): 19–32, 173 YDS, 1 TD
Rushing Leaders: Nico Evans (WYO): 33 CAR, 187 YDS, 1 TD; Tyler Nevens (SJSU): 17 CAR, 70 YDS
Receiving Leaders: Austin Fort (WYO): 2 REC, 28 YDS, 1 TD; Josh Oliver (SJSU): 5 REC, 66 YDS

Air Force

Passing Leaders: Tyler Vander Waal (WYO): 14–26, 225 YDS, 2 TD; Donald Hammond III (AFA): 5–9, 53 YDS, 2 INT
Rushing Leaders: Jevon Bigelow (WYO): 10 CAR, 36 YDS; Kadin Remsberg (AFA): 20 CAR, 128 YDS
Receiving Leaders: Tyree Mayfield (WYO): 4 REC, 112 YDS; Marcus Bennett (AFA): 3 REC, 31 YDS

at New Mexico

Passing Leaders: Tyler Vander Waal (WYO): 4–17, 41 YDS; Coltin Gerhart (UNM): 2–14, 31 YDS, 1 INT
Rushing Leaders: Xazavian Valladay (WYO): 22 CAR, 192 YDS, 2 TD; Tyrone Owens (UNM): 12 CAR, 18 YDS
Receiving Leaders: Raghib Ismail Jr. (WYO): 1 REC, 15 YDS; Anu Somoye (UNM): 1 REC, 19 YDS

Players in the 2019 NFL draft

References

Wyoming
Wyoming Cowboys football seasons
Wyoming Cowboys football